The Best of Feeder is Feeder's third UK compilation album, following Picture of Perfect Youth released in 2004 and The Singles released in 2006. The deluxe edition was released with a nine-track album titled Arrow.

Track listing
The album has 3 editions: a 2-CD 'standard' edition and two 'deluxe' editions available on 3 CDs and 4 LPs. Each edition contains a selection of 42 Feeder singles, plus some or all of the 9 tracks that make up Arrow. The only single not included on any edition is "This Town", furthermore, the album version of "Paperfaces" is used instead of the single version. “Walk Away”, which is on the nine track mini album, was first performed in 2010 on a Japanese live radio session.

 The 2-CD edition has 41 tracks. It intersperses 37 singles – it excludes "Tangerine", "Miss You", "Call Out", "Side by Side" and "Tracing Lines" – with 4 tracks from Arrow.
 The 3-CD edition has 50 tracks. The first 2 discs contain 41 singles – "Call Out" is excluded. The third disc contains Arrow in full.
 The 4-LP edition has 46 tracks. The first 3 LPs contain 37 singles – a different selection to the 2-CD edition, excluding "Paperfaces", "Save Us", "Miss You", "Side by Side" and "Tracing Lines". The fourth LP contains Arrow in full.

2-CD standard edition

3-CD deluxe edition

4-LP deluxe edition

Charts

References

2017 greatest hits albums
Feeder albums